Samuel Thorn Crockett (November 28, 1890 – February 4, 1946) was an American Democratic politician who served as a member of the Virginia Senate from 1926 to 1928.

The son of John H. Crockett (1864–1925) and his first wife, the former Emma Thorn (1866–1895), he succeeded his father after his death in office.

References

External links

1890 births
1946 deaths
Democratic Party Virginia state senators
20th-century American politicians